Reagill is a hamlet in the parish of Crosby Ravensworth, in the Eden district, in the English county of Cumbria, England. Its closest major settlements are Shap, Appleby-in-Westmorland, and Penrith. Nearby lies the village of Sleagill.

History 
Reagill was formerly called Renegill. The oldest building in the village is Reagill Grange, of which construction commenced in the 17th century. The Grange is a typical example of 17th–18th century English rural architecture, weatherproofed simply with lime-based render, and consisting of several wings all of different ages. It is still the principal building in the village, a family home as well as being a venue for gatherings of the villagers.

Reagill was the home of artist and sculptor Thomas Bland in the 18th century. Bland was well known at the time for his eccentric nature. His work is abundant in the local area, most notably his image garden in the centre of the village, which contains a wealth of carvings, and a carving of Queen Victoria at the nearby Shap Wells Hotel.

See also

Listed buildings in Crosby Ravensworth

References

 http://www.mauldy.supanet.com/local/reagill.htm

External links
 Cumbria County History Trust: Crosby Ravensworth (nb: provisional research only – see Talk page)

Hamlets in Cumbria
Crosby Ravensworth